Isaac Beitia (born 8 August 1995) is a Panamanian swimmer. He represented Panama at the 2019 World Aquatics Championships held in Gwangju, South Korea and he finished in 63rd place in the heats in the men's 50 metre freestyle event. In the men's 100 metre freestyle he finished in 58th place in the heats.

He also represented Panama at the 2019 Pan American Games held in Lima, Peru.

References 

Living people
1995 births
Place of birth missing (living people)
Panamanian male freestyle swimmers
Pan American Games competitors for Panama
Swimmers at the 2019 Pan American Games
Central American and Caribbean Games competitors for Panama
Competitors at the 2018 Central American and Caribbean Games
Competitors at the 2018 South American Games
20th-century Panamanian people
21st-century Panamanian people